David Causier (born 1973) is an English world champion player of English billiards.

Biography 
Causier won the English Amateur Billiards title in 1992, 1993, and 1995; and the UK Championship in 2000 and 2001 (following which no UK championship was held from 2002 to 2014).

In 2012, the IBSF World Billiards Championship was merged with the former professional championship under the name World Billiards Championship, and tournaments were held in both points and timed format. Causier won the 2013 150-up ("short format") title, and was runner-up in the timed ("long") format. He went on to win the 2015, 2016, 2017 short titles and the long format titles in 2015 and 2017.

Causier won four trophies in the 2018/19 season, despite not playing in all of the circuit's events, including winning the UK Open and the World Matchplay title.

His job was managing The Normanby pub in Middlesbrough from about 2011 to 2018, and he only played billiards part-time.

World Championship Finals record

Career Highlights 
English Amateur Billiards Champion 1992, 1993, 1995
2000 UK Champion
2001 UK Champion
2013 World Billiards Champion (150-up)
2014 World Billiards Championship (English billiards) runner-up (Long-up)
2015 World Billiards Champion (150-up)
2015 World Billiards Champion (Long-up)
2016 World Billiards Champion (150-up)
2017 World Billiards Champion (150-up)
2017 World Billiards Champion (Long-up)
2019 Irish Billiards Open Champion
2019 European Billiards Open Champion

References

External links
2017 LITEtask World Billiards Championship (1500up) Final: Peter Gilchrist v David Causier (YouTube)

English players of English billiards
World champions in English billiards